Whit Williams was a saxophonist and a major figure in the Baltimore jazz scene. In 1981, he founded Whit Williams Now's the Time Big Band, and the group has since played with Aretha Franklin and the Baltimore Symphony Orchestra, among others.

References
All About Jazz

[http://m.baltimoretimes-online.com/news/2020/may/29/rambling-rose-memorial-day-was-salute-remembering-/}}

American jazz saxophonists
American male saxophonists
Musicians from Baltimore
Living people
Year of birth missing (living people)
Place of birth missing (living people)
21st-century American saxophonists
Jazz musicians from Maryland
21st-century American male musicians
American male jazz musicians